Prince Regent was launched in New Brunswick in 1817. She sailed to England and changed her registry, but then unusually, in 1821, her ownership and registry returned to New Brunswick. She was wrecked on the coast of Maine in November 1823.

Career
Prince Regent first appeared in Lloyd's Register (LR) in 1818.

She was registered in Liverpool in 1818 

In Liverpool her ownership changed. The Register of Shipping gave it as T.Lange, and Lloyd's Register gave it as Ewing & Co.

The Saint John, New Brunswick merchants John Richard Partelow and Hugh Johnston, Sr., purchased Prince Regent and in 1821 transferred her registry back to Saint John.

Fate
On 2 November 1823, Prince Regent, Stanton, master, while bound from Liverpool for Saint John, was driven ashore and wrecked on Machias Seal Island, in the Bay of Fundy. Her crew was saved. The hull, part of the sails and rigging, along with 120 tons of coal, were sold at auction on November 7.

Citations

1817 ships
Age of Sail merchant ships of England
Maritime incidents in November 1823